Trust Me, I'm a Doctor was originally a BBC Two television programme looking at the state of health care in Britain with a combination of factual reporting and satire, presented by Phil Hammond. In 2013, a new BBC Two television series with the same name was launched, presented by a team comprising: medical journalist Michael Mosley, Chris van Tulleken, Saleyha Ahsan and surgeon Gabriel Weston.

Original series
The original series of the show ran for four series between 1996 and 1999. A book by Hammond, also entitled Trust Me, I'm a Doctor accompanied the series. The message of both book and series was that doctors were not infallible and you should learn as much about your own healthcare as possible. The series was broadcast after Dr Hammond assisted in exposing systemic problems in the NHS that led to poor results for child heart surgery in Britain.

New series
The new series sets out to provide viewers with the evidence behind health claims made in the media in order to allow them to make their own health decisions. The series website provides links and further information to allow viewers to read the evidence for themselves in more depth.  The first episode of the 2013 series had an audience of over 3 million viewers, and gained the highest audience figures for a factual programme on the channel, and was recommissioned.

Team 
Various presenters have contributed to different series. Notable presenters have included:

 Michael Moseley, medical journalist
 Guddi Singh, paediatric registrar
 Alain Gregoire, consultant psychiatrist
 Giles Yeo, obesity and endocrine geneticist
 Zoe Williams, GP and sports medicine
 Saleyha Ahsan, A&E doctor
 Chris van Tulleken, infectious diseases doctor
 Gabriel Weston, surgeon

References

External links
 
 

1996 British television series debuts
BBC television documentaries
1990s British documentary television series
2010s British documentary television series
2020s British documentary television series
1990s British medical television series
2010s British medical television series
2020s British medical television series
English-language television shows
British television series revived after cancellation